Andi Schmid is an Austrian luger and skeleton racer who competed from the mid-1980s to the early 1990s.

As a skeleton athlete, he won four medals in the men's event at the FIBT World Championships with one gold (1993) and three silvers (1990, 1991, 1994).

Schmid won the overall men's Skeleton World Cup title twice (1986-7, 1987-8).

Currently he works as the Performance Director for the British Skeleton Team.

External links
List of men's skeleton World Cup champions since 1987.
Men's skeleton world championship medalists since 1989
Skeletonsport.com

Austrian male skeleton racers
Living people
Year of birth missing (living people)